Iva Mladenovska (born 14 January 2007) is a Macedonian female handballer for ŽRK Metalurg and the North Macedonia national team.

She represented the North Macedonia at the 2022 European Women's Handball Championship.

References

External links

2007 births
Living people
People from Skopje